Salvate mia figlia (Save My Daughter) is a 1951 Italian melodrama film.

Cast
 Bianca Doria
 Juan de Landa
 Vittorio Duse
 Fosca Freda - Carla 
 Mary Jokam
 Franca Marzi - Ex amante di Andrea 
 Bianca Manenti
 Lamberto Maggiorani
 Andreina Mazzotto - Mariuccia 
 Sandro Ruffini - Chirurgo 
 Ermanno Randi - Andrea

External links
 

1951 films
1950s Italian-language films
Italian drama films
1951 drama films
Melodrama films
Italian black-and-white films
1950s Italian films